Big Brother 2006 was the sixth season of the Dutch version of Big Brother. It lasted from 18 August 2006 to 27 November 2006 for a total of 102 days. The presenter was Bridget Maasland.

Overview
Though the show launched on 18 August 2006, it did not start airing on television until two days later. Viewing numbers were half of that of the previous season which was largely caused by competition from a similar show The Golden Cage, broadcast immediately after Big Brother.

The season added an extra twist to the game, where most of the housemates had a partner who entered the house with them. Another added twist this season was the red phone. Every housemate had a safe deposit account of €30,000. When half was left(meaning one member of the pair had been evicted), the other half had to be donated to other housemates' safe. The winner was left with the amount accumulated. Two "jokers" (exemptions) were sold by auction. Marlies and Tijn won them for €25,300 and €29,200.

Housemates

Summary
Two of the cast members, Jeroen and Milica arrived one day early and had to pretend to be a couple. Milica's mother Hilde entered a day after most of the group. The first time, the red phone rang Egbert answered it and heard the message that the viewers would decide whether he would stay. One day later he was allowed to stay with 75% of the public vote. Jeroen, Hilde, Milica, Etiënne and Marcel formed a well-known click in the house. When Egbert dropped his key into a hole in the floor, he had to survive in an inflatable canoe in the swimming pool for two days to get it back. Big Brother nominated Semih and Marlies for a minor rule-breaking but this was annulled and Etiënne and Marcel were nominated instead for talking about their nomination strategy. Marcel was the first housemate to be evicted and donated half of the money to his son. Soon after, Monique's husband rushed to the house when it looked like her Tijn was getting close. After they wrote a few letters to each other she decided to stay. Afterward, Monique and Sabrina were given a private bedroom since Tijn and Etiënne wouldn't leave them alone at night. In the second round, Hilde and Etiënne were nominated, the latter because of his racist comments. The red telephone rang again and Semih heard that he would be nominated for four consecutive weeks. Marlies used her joker to put Janine up for nominations in her place. A week later, Egbert, Jeroen and Semih were nominated. During Egbert's eviction host Bridget told Egbert and Jeroen that they both had both been evicted because they had the same percentage of votes. However, Jeroen wasn't really evicted since for a secret mission Monique and Sabrina had to hide Jeroen in their private bedroom for a couple of days. They passed their mission, and all three gained immunity from the next eviction. Marlies was nominated after Sabrina used a joker she bought from Jeroen to put Marlies up for eviction in her place. The winner of the sixth season was the soccer player Jeroen.

Due to the disappointing ratings of this season, Big Brother was canceled in the Netherlands for the second time.

Nominations Table

Notes

External links
 World of Big Brother

2006 Dutch television seasons
06